Máel Muire  was a medieval Irish bishop: he was styled the "Bishop of Dundalethglass" (the original name of Downpatrick).

References

12th-century Roman Catholic bishops in Ireland
Bishops of Down
1117 deaths